440 Transport Squadron is a unit of the Canadian Armed Forces under the Royal Canadian Air Force. It is part of 8 Wing and works closely with Joint Task Force (North) located in Yellowknife, Northwest Territories.

Based at Yellowknife Airport and operating throughout Northern Canada, the unit's primary role is to provide support to the Canadian Forces, including the Canadian Rangers and the Royal Canadian Air Cadets, with search and rescue as a secondary role. The squadron operates four CC-138 DHC-6 Twin Otter aircraft that can flown on tundra tires, skis or floats, though, the float program was abandoned in 1999 when it was determined that there was not enough call for that capability in the CF.

The squadron was founded in the 1930s as an army cooperation squadron. It was for a time an air defence squadron from the start of the Second World War before moving to the United Kingdom. There it equipped as a fighter-bomber squadron under Royal Air Force (RAF) operational control, flying Hawker Typhoon aircraft. 440 Squadron supported the ground campaign through Northwest Europe until the end of the war.

History

1930s
 440 Squadron RCAF was a Second World War Royal Canadian Air Force squadron that operated as part of the RAF in Europe with the Hawker Typhoon.

The squadron was authorised in Vancouver on 5 October 1932 as  11 (Army Co-Operation) Squadron, an auxiliary squadron of the Royal Canadian Air Force. It received its first aircraft, four de Havilland DH.60M Gipsy Moths, settling down to a routine of flying training at the weekends, with an annual summer camp. In 1935, it received a single Fleet Fawn trainer, equipped for blind-flying training, and in 1937, received two Avro Tutors. The squadron was redesignated  111 (Coast Artillery Co-Operation) Squadron on 15 November 1937, with the duty of spotting for coastal defense artillery, although any operational training was still geared to the army-cooperation role. In March 1938, a single Avro 626 replaced one of the squadron's Gipsy Moths, allowing the squadron to carry out more realistic training, and in August that year, it received a single de Havilland Tiger Moth, with the Squadron's two remaining Gipsy Moths withdrawn in June 1939.

Second World War
At the outbreak of the Second World War the squadron formed a detachment at Patricia Bay on Vancouver Island, now Victoria International, before being redesignated  111 (Fighter) Squadron on 1 July 1940. At this time the squadron flew the Westland Lysander as no modern fighter aircraft were available.  It was disbanded on 1 February 1941 and then reformed on 3 November 1941 flying the Curtis Kittyhawk. The squadron and took part in air defence operations in Western Canada and the Aleutian Islands Campaign under RCAF Western Air Command. The squadron had the distinction of shooting down the only Japanese fighter by the RCAF home air force during the war.  From the new American base in Umnak, Alaska, flying the Curtis P-40K from American stock, 111 Squadron took part in several raids against the Japanese base at Kiska.  On 26 September 1942 the Commanding Officer, Squadron Leader K A Boomer, shot down an intercepting Nakajima A6M2-N Rufe fighter while leading four Canadian-manned P-40s involved in flak suppression.

Transfer to Britain
After the squadron moved to RAF Ayr where it was redesignated  440 (Fighter Bomber) Squadron on 8 February 1944 as an Article XV squadron under the control of the British Royal Air Force. It was the third Canadian Typhoon equipped squadron of 143 Wing. The squadron was equipped with the Hawker Hurricane for working up but changed to the Hawker Typhoon once they were delivered.

After a period of training the squadron began operations on 30 March 1944 with the Typhoons from RAF Hurn in the fighter bomber role. Originally the Typhoons were fitted with  bombs but later were able to carry a  bomb under each wing. The squadron supported and followed the allied armies through France, Netherlands and then into Germany. Although the Canadian Typhoons operated mostly as dive bombers they also flew top cover to protect their aircraft from interception.  While bombing in the St. Vith area on 27 December 1944, 440 Squadron engaged three Bf-109s, shooting down one of them, for the squadron's second aerial kill in the war.  The squadron was disbanded at Flensburg on 26 August 1945.

1950s
In 1953 the squadron was reformed at RCAF Station Bagotville and equipped with the Avro Canada CF-100 Canuck. From 1957 until 1962, when they were once again disbanded, the squadron, part of 3 Wing, was stationed at Zweibrücken Air Base, West Germany, as part of Canada's commitment to NATO.

Redesignation as transport and rescue
The squadron was reactivated a final time on 8 July 1968 at CFB Winnipeg as  440 Communications and Rescue Squadron with Douglas Dakotas and Vertol H-21 helicopters and redesignated as 440 Transport and Rescue Squadron in October. They later moved to CFB Namao just outside Edmonton where they operated de Havilland Canada CC-115 Buffalo and CC-138 Twin Otters. At the time, two of the Twin Otters were stationed in Yellowknife, and in 1994 after CFB Namao closed the squadron moved north to be redesignated  440 Transport Squadron in 1995.

 440 Squadron does not share a lineage with  11 (Bomber Reconnaissance) Squadron.

Aircraft operated

Notes

References

External links

Squadron lineage at Directorate of History and Heritage

Canadian Forces aircraft squadrons
Royal Canadian Air Force squadrons
Military units and formations established in 1944